Sotigena is a genus of moths of the family Erebidae. The genus was discovered by Herbert Druce in 1890.

Species
Sotigena dulcis H. Druce, 1890 Mexico
Sotigena notodontoides H. Druce, 1890 Mexico
Sotigena rictalis Dognin, 1914 Ecuador
Sotigena solivaga Schaus, 1929 Brazil (Santa Catarina)

References

Hypeninae